The Poh San Teng Temple ( is a Chinese temple located at the foot of Bukit China, next to the Malacca Warrior Monument and King's well in Malacca City, Malacca, Malaysia. The temple is dedicated to Tua Pek Kong and was founded in 1795 during the era of Dutch Malacca by Chinese Kapitan Chua Su Cheong (Tsai Shih-chang).

Features 
Since it is a graveyard temple, the names of the deity, "Fu De Zheng Shen" or "Tua Pek Kong" are inscribed with the temple is mainly dedicated to Tua Pek Kong. An inscription on a stele in the temple compound commemorating the founding of the temple, where it reads:

See also 
 Cheng Hoon Teng Temple
 Xiang Lin Si Temple
 List of tourist attractions in Malacca

References

External links 
 

Chinese-Malaysian culture
Taoist temples in Malaysia
Tourist attractions in Malacca
Buildings and structures in Malacca City
Religious buildings and structures completed in 1795